Lillian Frances Parker Wallace (11 Apr. 1890–30 May 1971) was an American historian and musician.  

Parker Wallace was Professor of history at Meredith College from 1921 to 1962.

Bibliography
 The Papacy and European Diplomacy: 1869-1878, University of North Carolina Press, 1948
 Leo XIII and the Rise of Socialism by Lillian Parker Wallace, Duke University Press, 1966

References

1890 births
1971 deaths
20th-century American historians
Meredith College faculty